Carmine Galante (February 21, 1910 – July 12, 1979) was an American mobster. Galante was rarely seen without a cigar hanging from his mouth, leading to the nickname "The Cigar" and "Lilo" (a Sicilian term for cigar). Galante had a long career in organized crime and rose to acting boss (unofficial) of the Bonanno crime family. He was assassinated in 1979 while dining in a restaurant.

Biography

Background 
Camillo Carmine Galante was born on February 21, 1910, in a tenement building in the East Harlem section of Manhattan. His parents, Vincenzo "James" Galante and Vincenza Russo, had emigrated from Castellammare del Golfo, Sicily, to New York City in 1906, where Vincenzo was a fisherman.

Carmine Galante had two brothers, Samuel and Peter Galante, and two sisters, Josephine and Angelina Galante. On February 10, 1945, Galante married Helen Marulli, by whom he had three children; James Galante (not Jimmy Galante former owner of Danbury Thrashers), Camille Galante, and Angela Galante. For the last 20 years of his life, Carmine Galante lived with Ann Acquavella; the couple had two children together. He was the uncle to Bonanno crime family capo James Carmine Galante.

While in prison in 1931, doctors diagnosed Galante as having a psychopathic personality.

Galante owned the Rosina Costume Company in Brooklyn, New York  and was associated with the Abco Vending Company of West New York, New Jersey.

Early years 
At the age of 10, Galante was sent to reform school due to his criminal activities. He soon formed a juvenile street gang on New York's Lower East Side. By the age of 15, Galante had dropped out of seventh grade. As a teenager, Galante became a Mafia associate during the Prohibition era, becoming a leading enforcer by the end of the decade. During this period, Galante also worked as a fish sorter and at an artificial flower shop. On December 12, 1925, the 15-year-old Galante pleaded guilty to assault charges. On December 22, 1926, Galante was sentenced to at least two and a half years in state prison.

In August 1930, Galante was arrested for the murder of police officer Walter DeCastilla during a payroll robbery. However, Galante was never indicted.  Also in 1930, New York Police Department (NYPD) officer Joseph Meenahan  caught Galante and other gang members attempting to hijack a truck in Williamsburg, Brooklyn. In the ensuing gun battle, Galante wounded Meenahan and a six-year-old bystander, both survived. On February 8, 1931, after pleading guilty to attempted robbery Galante was sentenced to 12 and a half years in state prison. On May 1, 1939, Galante was released from prison on parole.

By 1940, Galante was carrying out "hits" for Vito Genovese, the official underboss of the Luciano crime family. Galante had an underworld reputation for viciousness and was suspected by the NYPD of involvement in over eighty murders. Galante reportedly had a cold, dead-eyed stare with eyes that betrayed an utter indifference to human life, scaring both law enforcement officers and other Mafia members. Ralph Salerno, a former NYPD detective, once said, "Of all the gangsters that I've met personally, and I've met dozens of them in all of my years, there were only two who, when I looked them straight in the eye, I decided I wouldn't want them to be really personally mad at me. Aniello Dellacroce was one and Carmine Galante was the other. They had bad eyes, I mean, they had the eyes of killers. You could see how frightening they were, the frigid glare of a killer."

In 1943, Galante allegedly murdered Carlo Tresca, the publisher of an anti-fascist newspaper in New York. Genovese, living in exile in Italy, offered to kill Tresca as a favor to Italian Prime Minister Benito Mussolini. Genovese allegedly gave the murder contract to Galante. On January 11, 1943, Galante allegedly shot and killed Tresca as he stepped outside his newspaper office in Manhattan, and then got in a car and drove away. Although Galante was arrested as a suspect, no one was ever charged in the murder. After the Tresca murder, Galante was sent back to prison on a parole violation. On December 21, 1944, Galante was released from prison.

Later years 

In 1953, boss Joseph Bonanno sent Galante to Montreal, Quebec to organize the family’s drug business and rackets there. He worked with Vincenzo Cotroni of the Cotroni crime family in the French Connection. The Bonannos were importing huge amounts of heroin by ship into Montreal and then sending it into the United States. Police also estimated that Galante was collecting gambling profits in Montreal worth about $50 million per year. In April 1956, due to Galante's strong-arm extortion tactics, the Canadian Government deported him back to the United States.

In October 1957, Bonanno and Galante, now a consigliere, held a hotel meeting in Palermo, Sicily on plans to import heroin into the United States. Attendees included Lucky Luciano and other American mobsters, with a Sicilian Mafia delegation led by Giuseppe Genco Russo. As part of the agreement, Sicilian mobsters would come to the U.S. to distribute the narcotics. Galante brought many young men, known as Zips, from his family home of Castellammare del Golfo, Trapani, to work as bodyguards, contract killers and drug traffickers.

In 1958, after being indicted on drug conspiracy charges, Galante went into hiding. On June 3, 1959, New Jersey State Police officers arrested Galante after stopping his car on the Garden State Parkway close to New York City. Federal agents had recently discovered that Galante was hiding in a house on Pelican Island off the South Jersey shore. After posting $100,000 bail, he was released. On May 18, 1960, Galante was indicted on a second set of narcotics charges; he surrendered voluntarily.

Galante's first narcotics trial started on November 21, 1960; one of his co-defendants was William Bentvena, a Gambino made man who was murdered by Henry Hill's associates James Burke and Thomas DeSimone. From the beginning, the first trial was characterized by jurors and alternates dropping out and coercive courtroom displays by the defendants. On May 15, 1961, the judge declared a mistrial. The jury foreman fell down some stairs at an abandoned building in the middle of the night and was unable to continue the trial due to injury. Galante was sentenced to 20 days in jail for contempt of court. On July 10, 1962, after being convicted in his second narcotics trial, Galante was sentenced to 20 years in federal prison.

Power grab 

In January 1974, Galante was released from prison on parole. Following his release from prison, Galante allegedly ordered the bombing of the doors to the private mausoleum of his enemy Frank Costello in St. Michael's Cemetery, who had died in 1973.

On February 23, 1974, at a meeting at the Americana Hotel in Manhattan, the Commission named Philip "Rusty" Rastelli as boss. When Rastelli was sent to prison in 1976, Galante seized control of the Bonannos as unofficial acting boss.

During the late 1970s, Galante allegedly organized the murders of at least eight members of the Gambino family, with whom he had an intense rivalry, in order to take over a massive drug-trafficking operation.

On March 3, 1978, Galante's parole was revoked by the United States Parole Commission for allegedly associating with other Bonanno mobsters, and he was sent back to prison.  However, on February 27, 1979, a judge ruled that the government had illegally revoked Galante's parole and ordered his immediate release.

Death 

The New York crime families were alarmed at Galante's brazen attempt to take over the narcotics market. Genovese crime family boss Frank Tieri began contacting Cosa Nostra leaders to build a consensus for Galante's murder, even obtaining approval from the retired Joseph Bonanno. In 1979, they received a boost when the official boss, Rastelli, sought Commission approval to kill Galante. Joseph Massino, a Bonanno soldier loyal to Rastelli, relayed the request to the Commission, which swiftly approved a contract on Galante.

On July 12, 1979, Galante was killed just as he finished eating lunch on an open patio at Joe and Mary's Italian-American Restaurant at 205 Knickerbocker Avenue in Bushwick, Brooklyn. He was dining with Leonard Coppola, a Bonanno capo and staunch Galante loyalist, and restaurant owner/cousin Giuseppe Turano, a Bonanno soldier. Also sitting at the table were Galante's Sicilian bodyguards, Baldassare Amato and Cesare Bonventre. At 2:45 pm, three ski-masked men entered the restaurant, walked into the patio, and opened fire with shotguns and handguns. Galante, Turano, and Coppola were killed instantly. A picture of the murdered Galante showed a cigar still in his mouth. Amato and Bonventre, who had done nothing to protect Galante, were left unharmed. The gunmen then ran out of the restaurant.

Aftermath 
The Roman Catholic Archdiocese of New York refused to allow a funeral mass for Galante due to his notoriety.  Galante was buried at Saint John's Cemetery in Middle Village, Queens.

In 1984, Bonventre was found murdered in a New Jersey warehouse, allegedly to guarantee his silence in the Galante murder. On January 13, 1987, Anthony Indelicato was sentenced to 40 years in prison, as a defendant in the Commission trial, for the Galante, Coppola, and Turano murders.

Galante is depicted in the first episode of the UK history TV channel Yesterday's documentary series Mafia's Greatest Hits.

References

Books
 Pistone, Joseph D.; & Woodley, Richard (1999) Donnie Brasco: My Undercover Life in the Mafia, Hodder & Stoughton. .
 Pistone, Joseph D.; & Brandt, Charles (2007). Donnie Brasco: Unfinished Business, Running Press. .
 DeStefano, Anthony. The Last Godfather: Joey Massino & the Fall of the Bonanno Crime Family. California: Citadel, 2006.

External links 
"FBI Files Carmine Galante 1 through 12"
Seize the Night: Carmine Galante
Carmine "Lilo" Galante at Find A Grave

 

1910 births
1979 deaths
1979 murders in the United States
American drug traffickers
American crime bosses
American people convicted of murder
Bonanno crime family
Bosses of the Bonanno crime family
Burials at St. John's Cemetery (Queens)
Catholics from New York (state)
Deaths by firearm in Brooklyn
Fugitives
Mafia hitmen
Male murder victims
Murdered American gangsters of Sicilian descent
People from East Harlem
People murdered by the Bonanno crime family
People murdered in New York City
People with antisocial personality disorder